Cieszyna  is a village in the administrative district of Gmina Frysztak, within Strzyżów County, Subcarpathian Voivodeship, in south-eastern Poland.

The village has an approximate population of 980.

References

Cieszyna